Virgil Township is a township in Vernon County, in the U.S. state of Missouri.

Virgil Township takes its name from the community of Virgil City, Missouri.

References

Townships in Missouri
Townships in Vernon County, Missouri